In Birmingham, England, each council constituency is managed by a Constituency Committee, made up of all the councillors for the wards in that constituency.

Birmingham's ten Council constituencies were formally created as eleven "districts" on 5 April 2004, based on the existing parliamentary constituencies as part of a move to devolve responsibility for the management of local services away from the centre of Birmingham City Council, the largest such body in Europe.

See also
Government of Birmingham, England
Area committee

References

Birmingham City Council